Ju Kyong-shik is a North Korean former footballer. He represented North Korea on at least eleven occasions between 1988 and 1989, scoring four goals.

Career statistics

International

International goals
Scores and results list North Korea's goal tally first, score column indicates score after each North Korea goal.

References

Date of birth unknown
Living people
North Korean footballers
North Korea international footballers
Association football forwards
Year of birth missing (living people)